St. Edmund Campion Catholic Secondary School is a high school in Brampton, Ontario, Canada. The school is operated by the Dufferin-Peel Catholic District School Board. As of now there are over 1,700 students enrolled in, and the uniform consists of a navy blue sweater and khaki pants.

Feeder Elementary Schools 
 St. Aidan Catholic 
 St. Angela Merici Catholic
 St. Bonaventure Catholic
 St. Daniel Comboni Catholic
 St. Lucy Catholic
 St. Josephine Bakhita Catholic
 St. Maria Goretti
 St. Rita Elementary School

History 

The school opened on September 2, 2003, with 250 grade 9 students in Mississauga whilst the Brampton building was under construction. The Mississauga building was shared by grade 9 students from St. Marcellinus, and John Cabot Secondary Schools. In its second year, there were grade 9 and 10 classes, and the building was shared with students from Metropolitan Andrei elementary school. The school moved to its present building in Brampton in 2005, with 1,300 students in grades 9, 10, and 11, and a grade 12 class from 2006.

Academics 

In August 2009, the school principal Kevin McGuire removed the book To Kill a Mockingbird from the grade 10 curriculum due to a complaint received from a parent who expressed concern about the language in the book. It was returned to the grade 10 curriculum in 2011.

St. Edmund Campion offers an Advanced Placement (AP) Program. The AP program provides an enriched classroom setting for highly motivated students in the areas of English, Math, and French. History and Science will be added in grade 10. The program begins in Grade 9 with pre-AP classes in which students study both the Ontario and the AP curriculum. This allows students to continue AP classes in Grades 11 and 12 that prepare students to write AP exams for advanced placement or credit in university.

As of the 201617 school year, St. Edmund Campion is ranked the 7th best school in Brampton out of 25 schools in the city. St. Edmund Campion is the second best school in West Brampton, after St. Roch Catholic Secondary School. 

In May 2018, St. Edmund Campion Secondary School  was chosen as a recipient of the 201718 Premier’s Award for Accepting Schools. The school was awarded for demonstrating initiative, creativity and leadership in promoting a safe, inclusive and accepting school climate.

Notable events
In 2012, St. Edmund Campion's then vice-principal was suspended after facing impaired driving and drug charges. 

Naveed Shahnawaz, a recent St. Edmund Campion graduate, was killed in 2013 at the CNE. 

A number of violent incidents have also occurred on school grounds. In October 2014, a teenager was stabbed at the school, putting the area on lockdown. A 17-year-old student from St. Edmund Campion was later taken into custody. Later that year, a student was stabbed in the torso while another received injuries to his arm following an altercation involving a knife . In June 2017, Peel Regional Police  arrested a 16-year-old girl after officers allege she encouraged fellow students to bring weapons to school.  Investigators said the girl wanted her peers to bring weapons to the school, in order to disrupt the school day

Notable alumni

 Shay Colley, basketball player
 Raz Fresco, rapper/producer
 Cyle Larin, footballer
 Jonathan Osorio, footballer
 Nicholas Osorio, footballer
 Ndzemdzela Langwa, footballer
 Mike Edem, CFL player  
 PARTYNEXTDOOR, musician/artist
 Royce Metchie, CFL player
 Tajon Buchanan, footballer
 Godfrey Onyeka, CFL player
 NorthSideBenji, rapper
 Houdini (rapper), rapper
 Cameron Lawson, CFL player
 Danyal Barton, Photographer
 Jahvon Blair, basketball player
 Oshane Samuels, CFL player

See also
List of high schools in Ontario

References

External links
 St. Edmund Campion Secondary School

High schools in Brampton
Catholic secondary schools in Ontario
Educational institutions established in 2003
2003 establishments in Ontario